Teekoy is a southern Indian village, situated in the eastern part of Kottayam district in Kerala state.

Teekoy is located 18 km east of the town Pala, and is 44 km north-east of the district capital Kottayam. It is between the towns of Vagamon, Poonjar, Erattupetta, and Thalanadu. The village is situated about 165 km north of state capital Thiruvananthapuram.

Geography
Teekoy has features of both midland countryside and the Malanad hill area. Teekoy as a village is medium-sized but as a panchayat is quite long. It covers many areas such as Aniyilappu, Mavadi, Vellikulam, Thalanad and Adukkom, stretching about 20 kilometres and reaching up to Vagamon, at about three thousand feet above sea level. The place is known for its agriculture and landscape. It is full of hills and valleys in the middle of which flows the Meenachil river.

People
Large-scale settlement in Teekoy began more than 100 years ago. It resembles a tropical rainforest, and trees like teak and jackfruit are found in the Western Ghats region growing alongside coconut, rubber, arecanut, and other crops. The first large-scale rubber plantation in India was established in Teekoy. Most of the people are farmers and they cultivate rubber, elachi, ginger, cardamom, clove, nutmeg, turmeric, pepper, cashew and other spices. A considerable variety of medicinal plants also grow in Teekoy which have been used in making the traditional home remedies.

A sizable proportion of the population is Syrian Christians (Syro-Malabar Catholic), but there is also a large minority of Muslims and Hindus. There is a small colony of converted Dalit Christians among the community as well. There are also some third- and fourth-generation Tamil people, descendants of workers who came to work in the rubber plantations in Teekoy many decades ago. Before Independence in 1947,  Teekoy had some English people who had set up rubber plantation in the area. As a legacy of the colonial era, a cantilever bridge still connects the two banks of the Meenachil river two kilometres above Teekoy town.

Culture
Teekoy is a rural but modern village with predominantly hilly topography. It has a dominant village culture, with celebrating the annual festivals, feasts in church etc. Indian National Congress and Kerala Congress (M) are the main parties. Adv. Justine Jacob (Kerala Congress (M)) was the youngest President of Teekoy at his age of twenty-seven.

People at Teekoy are educated and self-employed or employed either in government, private or abroad. Educational institutions include St. Mary's High School, now more than six decades old.

Places of worship

 St Mary's Forane Church, Teekoy - under the Syro-Malabar Diocese of Pala
 Teekoy Jama Masjid Mosque 
 Sree Narayana Guru Mandhiram
 Sree Karuvela Muthu Swami Kovil
 St Thomas Syro-Malabar Church Mangalagiri
 St Joseph church

Climate
Teekoy's climate has a heavy rain season and mild summer. Summer rains are not infrequent. With hills in the backdrop, it never gets very hot, and the climate tends towards windy and cool.

References

External links 

Articles containing potentially dated statements from 2001
All articles containing potentially dated statements
Cities and towns in Kottayam district
Tourist attractions in Kottayam district
Villages in Kottayam district